James William Nowell Dillimore (19 December 1894 – 1980) was an English professional footballer who played as an inside forward in the Football League for Millwall.

Personal life 
In his later years, Dillimore worked as a street musician.

Career statistics

References

Footballers from Canning Town
English footballers
Barking F.C. players
Weymouth F.C. players
English Football League players
1894 births
1980 deaths
Association football inside forwards
Brentford F.C. wartime guest players
Association football forwards